Halo I–IV is a box set by American industrial rock band Nine Inch Nails, released exclusively for the Black Friday Record Store Day on 27 November 2015. The box set contains the 1989 original version of the band's debut studio album, Pretty Hate Machine, on 180-gram black vinyl, as well as the original 12-inch singles for "Down in It", "Head Like a Hole", and "Sin" on 120-gram black vinyl.

The title Halo I–IV refers to the first four catalog numbers in Nine Inch Nails' discography.

Track listing

Halo I: "Down in It"
Side A
 "Down in It" (Skin)
 "Down In It" (Shred)

Side B
 "Down In It" (Singe)

Halo II: Pretty Hate Machine
Side A
 "Head Like a Hole"
 "Terrible Lie"
 "Down in It"
 "Sanctified"
 "Something I Can Never Have"

Side B
 "Kinda I Want To"
 "Sin"
 "That's What I Get"
 "The Only Time"
 "Ringfinger"

Halo III: "Head Like a Hole"
Side A
 "Head Like a Hole" (Slate)
 "Terrible Lie" (Sympathetic Mix)
 "Head Like a Hole" (Clay)

Side B
 "Head Like a Hole" (Copper)
 "You Know Who You Are"
 "Head Like a Hole" (Soil)

Halo IV: "Sin"
Side A
 "Sin" (Long)
 "Sin" (Dub)

Side B
 "Get Down Make Love"
 "Sin" (Short)

Charts

References

External links
 Halo I–IV on Record Store Day official website

2015 compilation albums
Albums produced by Adrian Sherwood
Albums produced by Al Jourgensen
Albums produced by Flood (producer)
Albums produced by John Fryer (producer)
Albums produced by Keith LeBlanc
Albums produced by Trent Reznor
Nine Inch Nails compilation albums
Record Store Day releases